Sheridan County is a county in the U.S. state of Nebraska. As of the 2010 United States Census, the population was 5,469. Its county seat is Rushville. The county was formed in 1885, and was named for General Philip H. Sheridan.

In the Nebraska license plate system, Sheridan County is represented by the prefix 61 (it had the sixty-first-largest number of vehicles registered in the state when the license plate system was established in 1922).

Geography
Sheridan County lies on the north line of Nebraska. Its north boundary line abuts the south boundary line of the state of South Dakota. An upper reach of the Niobrara River flows eastward through the upper central part of the county. The terrain consists of arid rolling hills, dotted with small lakes in the eastern and southern parts of the county. It is the fourth-largest county in Nebraska by area.

Major highways

 
  Nebraska Highway 2
  Nebraska Highway 27
  Nebraska Highway 87
  Nebraska Highway 250

Adjacent counties

 Oglala Lakota County, South Dakota - north
 Cherry County - east
 Grant County - southeast
 Garden County - south
 Morrill County - southwest
 Dawes County - west
 Box Butte County - west

Protected areas
 Smith Lake State Wildlife Management Area
 Walgren Lake State Recreation Area

Demographics

As of the 2000 United States Census, there were 6,198 people, 2,549 households, and 1,728 families in the county. The population density was 2 people per square mile (1/km2). There were 3,013 housing units at an average density of 1.2 per square mile (0.55/km2). The racial makeup of the county was 88.11% White, 0.08% Black or African American, 9.23% Native American, 0.15% Asian, 0.02% Pacific Islander, 0.34% from other races, and 2.08% from two or more races. 1.47% of the population were Hispanic or Latino of any race. 31.6% were of German, 8.8% English, 7.8% Irish and 7.3% American ancestry.

There were 2,549 households, out of which 30.00% had children under the age of 18 living with them, 56.80% were married couples living together, 8.00% had a female householder with no husband present, and 32.20% were non-families. 29.60% of all households were made up of individuals, and 16.30% had someone living alone who was 65 years of age or older. The average household size was 2.38 and the average family size was 2.95.

The county population contained 25.60% under the age of 18, 6.20% from 18 to 24, 22.90% from 25 to 44, 23.60% from 45 to 64, and 21.70% who were 65 years of age or older. The median age was 42 years. For every 100 females there were 96.00 males. For every 100 females age 18 and over, there were 91.50 males.

The median income for a household in the county was $29,484, and the median income for a family was $35,167. Males had a median income of $21,892 versus $18,423 for females. The per capita income for the county was $14,844.  About 11.00% of families and 13.20% of the population were below the poverty line, including 20.30% of those under age 18 and 7.50% of those age 65 or over.

Communities

Cities
 Gordon
 Rushville (county seat)

Villages
 Clinton
 Hay Springs

Census-designated place
 Whiteclay

Unincorporated communities
 Bingham
 Ellsworth
 Hoffland
 Lakeside

Ghost town
 Antioch

1910 Census-designated places

 Beaver
 Box Butte
 Clinton
 Extension
 Grant
 Hunter
 Kinkaid
 Milan
 Mill
 Minnetonka
 Mirage
 Niobrara
 Pine Creek
 Ranch
 Reno
 Running Water
 Schill
 Sharp
 Spring Lake
 Township 31 - Hay Springs Village
 Township 32 - Range 46
 Township 33 - Gordon Village
 Wolf Creek
 Wounded Knee

Politics
Sheridan County voters have traditionally voted Republican; every national election since 1940 has seen Sheridan County choose the Republican Party presidential candidate. The county, alongside neighboring Garden County were the only two counties not to back Democratic Governor Ben Nelson in his 1994 landslide.

See also
 National Register of Historic Places listings in Sheridan County, Nebraska

References

 
1885 establishments in Nebraska
Populated places established in 1885